The Boston Soccer Club was a member of the American Soccer League. They were renamed the Boston Bears for the Fall 1929 ASL season.

In 1925, the ASL and the St. Louis Soccer League (SLSL) boycotted the National Challenge Cup, now known as the U.S. Open Cup.  The "Wonder Workers" or "Woodsies" (after team president G. A. G. Wood), as they were dubbed, had won the 1925 league cup, known as the Lewis Cup.  That victory qualified them for the one time American Professional Soccer Championship pitting them with against the Ben Millers, the top SLSL team.  The Wonder Workers defeated the Ben Millers in three games.  The Wonder Workers won the Lewis Cup again in 1927.

After the 1925/26 ASL season the Wonder Workers, the Brooklyn Wanderers and the New Bedford Whalers joined with four top Canadian clubs to form the one-off International Soccer League held that summer and early fall.

Year-by-year

W
Defunct soccer clubs in Massachusetts
American Soccer League (1921–1933) teams